The 2007 Euroleague Final Four was the concluding Euroleague Final Four tournament of the 2006–07 Euroleague season. It was held on May 4–6, 2007. All of the games were held at the O.A.C.A. Olympic Indoor Hall, in Marousi, Athens, Greece.

Bracket

Semifinals

Semifinal A

Semifinal B

Third-place game

Final
Panathinaikos played its 5th European final, while CSKA played in its 9th final. Željko Obradović won his sixth EuroLeague title, which made him the most successful coach in league history.

Awards

Euroleague Final Four MVP
 Dimitris Diamantidis ( Panathinaikos)

Euroleague Finals Top Scorer
 Theo Papaloukas ( CSKA Moscow)

External links
Euroleague.net - Official EuroLeague homepage.
Eurobasket.com - Popular basketball news site.
TalkBasket.net - Basketball forum.

Final Four
2006–07
2006–07 in Greek basketball
2006–07 in Russian basketball
2006–07 in Spanish basketball
International basketball competitions hosted by Greece
Sports competitions in Athens